Cameron Pearce Norman (born 12 October 1995) is an English professional footballer who plays as a defender for Newport County.

Club career

Norwich City
Born in Norwich, Norman joined Norwich City at the age of 10 and was promoted to the under-18 squad as a scholar two years later. A key figure during their FA Youth Cup campaign in 2013, in which Norwich beat Chelsea to win the competition for the first time in 30 years, Norman went on to sign his first professional contract in May 2014.

On 29 October 2015, Norman joined National League side Woking on a one-month loan deal and made his professional debut during their 1–0 away defeat against Kidderminster Harriers two days later. Following several loan extensions, Norman became a regular in Woking's starting eleven and scored his first goal for the club during their emphatic 2–1 away victory over Forest Green Rovers, which ended Forest Green's hopes of an automatic promotion place.

On 10 June 2016, following his return from Woking, it was announced that Norman would leave Norwich at the expiration of his current deal.

Non-League
Following his release from Norwich, Norman had spells at Norwich United, Concord Rangers and Needham Market, before joining Southern League Premier Division side King's Lynn Town in August 2017. On the opening day of the season, he made his debut during their 2–0 home victory over Gosport Borough, playing the full 90 minutes. Following an impressive start to the season, his form attracted the interest of many National League and Football League sides. Following an impressive debut season with King's Lynn, in which Norman had featured fifty-one times, scoring seven goals, it was announced that he would leave the club in May 2018.

Oxford United
On 18 May 2018, following his departure from King's Lynn, Norman made the move to League One side Oxford United. He made his debut in a first-round EFL Cup win over Coventry City on 14 August and his league debut in a home defeat to Accrington Stanley a week later.

Walsall
Norman transferred to Walsall for an undisclosed fee during the January 2019 transfer window. He scored his first goal for Walsall when he scored in an EFL Trophy tie against Forest Green Rovers on 12 November 2019.

Newport County
On 4 June 2021, he signed a two-year deal with Newport County. He made his debut for Newport on 7 August 2021 in the starting line-up for the 1-0 League Two win against Oldham Athletic. Norman scored his first goal for Newport on 25 January 2022 in the 1-0 League Two win against Leyton Orient.

Career statistics

Honours
Individual
Newport County Player of the Year: 2021–22

References

External links

1995 births
Living people
Footballers from Norwich
English footballers
Association football defenders
Norwich City F.C. players
Woking F.C. players
Norwich United F.C. players
Concord Rangers F.C. players
Needham Market F.C. players
King's Lynn Town F.C. players
Oxford United F.C. players
Walsall F.C. players
National League (English football) players
Isthmian League players
Southern Football League players